Thierno Boubacar Diallo (born 22 November 2000) is a Spanish male artistic gymnast who is a member of the national team.

Early years
Diallo was born on 22 November 2000 in Conakry, Guinea. When he was six years old he attended a talent scouting program at his school in Manresa and was encouraged to start gymnastics by the coaches who saw his potential.

Diallo was naturalized in 2015 and debuted with the senior national gymnastics team in 2018.

Career
Diallo won a team all-around gold medal at the 2018 Mediterranean Games along with Néstor Abad, Nicolau Mir, Alberto Tallón and Rayderley Zapata. The same group finished sixth at the 2018 European Championships. Diallo also competed in the 2018 and 2019 World Championships.

At the Spanish national championships, Diallo placed third in 2018 and second in 2020 in the individual all-around.

Diallo qualified for the 2020 Summer Olympics in the team event.

References

External links
 

Living people
2000 births
Spanish male artistic gymnasts
Guinean male artistic gymnasts
Mediterranean Games gold medalists for Spain
Competitors at the 2018 Mediterranean Games
Gymnasts at the 2022 Mediterranean Games
Olympic gymnasts of Spain
Gymnasts at the 2020 Summer Olympics
Guinean emigrants to Spain
Naturalised citizens of Spain
Spanish sportspeople of African descent
Spanish people of Guinean descent
Sportspeople from Conakry
Sportspeople from Manresa
21st-century Spanish people